Bah Wilderness is an MGM cartoon, featuring Barney Bear, who goes camping out in the forest, similar to his first cartoon, The Bear That Couldn't Sleep. It is the ninth Barney Bear cartoon.

Plot
Barney Bear goes camping in a forest. He finds a small clearing in the woods and begins to set up camp. He starts off by inflating a "Snuggly Wuggly Water Mattress Sleeping Bag", then gets changed to his pajamas, with all the animals watching him. Barney scares them off, puts on his PJs and throws his boot at a noisy wolf, only to have it thrown back at him.

Unbeknownst to him, a porcupine had snuck under Barney's covers. He finally goes to bed and runs up a tree when the porcupine spikes his bottom. Barney gets back down and sets up bear traps and mouse traps around his camp, only to fall for them himself when a squirrel wakes him up with the radio.

Barney falls asleep after hearing a lullaby, but the air tube of his water mattress gets sucked into his mouth causing him to accidentally pump a lot more air into his sleeping bag, overinflating it in his sleep, but he suddenly awakens just about a second before his sleeping bag bursts, causing a flood that Barney decides to sleep under.

See also
The Bear That Couldn't Sleep
The Rookie Bear
Goggle Fishing Bear
Wee-Willie Wildcat
Bird-Brain Bird Dog
The Fishing Bear

References

External links 

1943 animated films
1943 short films
1943 films
1940s American animated films
1940s animated short films
Films directed by Rudolf Ising
Metro-Goldwyn-Mayer animated short films
Films scored by Scott Bradley
Films produced by Fred Quimby
Films set in forests
Metro-Goldwyn-Mayer cartoon studio short films
Barney Bear films
1940s English-language films